Country Joe may refer to:

 Country Joe McDonald, lead singer of Country Joe and the Fish
 Joe West (umpire), Major League Baseball umpire